

578001–578100 

|-id=053
| 578053 Jordillorca ||  || Jordi Llorca Piqué (born 1966) is a Spanish chemist and professor at the Polytechnic University of Catalonia (BarcelonaTech). He was a meteoricist at UMN's Institute of Meteoritics in New Mexico, and founded a citizen scientist group which recovered hundreds of meteorites (Src, Src) || 
|}

578101–578200 

|-id=164
| 578164 Rerrichbéla || 2013 XO || Béla Rerrich (1881–1932), a Hungarian architect and landscape designer, known for new ways of designing public green spaces and for his building complex around Dóm Square in Szeged town. || 
|}

578201–578300 

|-bgcolor=#f2f2f2
| colspan=4 align=center | 
|}

578301–578400 

|-bgcolor=#f2f2f2
| colspan=4 align=center | 
|}

578401–578500 

|-bgcolor=#f2f2f2
| colspan=4 align=center | 
|}

578501–578600 

|-bgcolor=#f2f2f2
| colspan=4 align=center | 
|}

578601–578700 

|-bgcolor=#f2f2f2
| colspan=4 align=center | 
|}

578701–578800 

|-bgcolor=#f2f2f2
| colspan=4 align=center | 
|}

578801–578900 

|-bgcolor=#f2f2f2
| colspan=4 align=center | 
|}

578901–579000 

|-bgcolor=#f2f2f2
| colspan=4 align=center | 
|}

References 

578001-579000